Lipps Island is a small rocky island  west of Litchfield Island, off the southwest coast of Anvers Island, off the Antarctic Peninsula. Lipps Island was named by the United States Advisory Committee on Antarctic Names (US-ACAN) for Dr. Jere H. Lipps, leader (1971–1974) of the United States Antarctic Research Program (USARP) team making studies of shallow water benthic foraminifera and other organisms along Antarctic Peninsula, including this area.  Lipps Island is located in Arthur Harbor near the US Antarctic Research Program's Palmer Station.

References

See also
 Composite Antarctic Gazetteer
 List of Antarctic and sub-Antarctic islands
 List of Antarctic islands south of 60° S
 SCAR
 Territorial claims in Antarctica

Islands of the Palmer Archipelago